Alfredo "Freddie" Brown (December 4, 1940 – April 30, 2002) was an American singer-songwriter, known for his contributions to New Mexico music and his ability to seamlessly switch between country music and Spanish music.

Biography
Alfredo "Freddie" Brown was born in Winston, New Mexico, to Alfred C. Brown and Mary Brown. His sons, Bo Brown and AB, continue to perform music; Bo Brown is a New Mexico musician, and AB is an R&B musician.

Discography

Albums
El Versatil
El Sensacional
Borracho Perdido
From: All Of Me

Compilations
The Immortal Freddie Brown
His Life Story
His Heart & Soul
Recuerdos De Freddie Brown Vol. 1
Recuerdos De Freddie Brown Vol. 1

References

1940 births
2002 deaths
American country guitarists
American male guitarists
American country singer-songwriters
American male singer-songwriters
American performers of Latin music
Singers from New Mexico
New Mexico music artists
People from Sierra County, New Mexico
Rock en Español musicians
Songwriters from New Mexico
Spanish-language singers of the United States
20th-century American singers
20th-century American guitarists
Guitarists from New Mexico
20th-century American male singers